Sežana is a town in the Slovenian Littoral region of Slovenia, near the border with Italy. It is the seat of the Municipality of Sežana.

Name
Sežana was attested in written sources in 1152 as in Cesan (and as Ses(s)ana in 1293 and Sexana in 1442). The name is of unclear origin. The early transcriptions do not support a connection with Saint Susanna or with the Friulian toponym Susáns. The presumed suffix -ana would indicate a Romance origin, making possible a derivation from the Latin personal name Sessius. Another possibility is derivation from the estate name *Sextiānum, and a Lombard origin of the name has also been suggested. In the 19th century the names Sessana and Sehsana were in official use.

History
Until 1918, the town was part of the Austrian monarchy (Austrian side after the compromise of 1867), head of the district of the same name, one of the 11 Bezirkshauptmannschaften in the Austrian Littoral province.

Sežana remained a small and rather insignificant village until the mid-19th century, when the Austrian Southern Railway Company built the Austrian Southern Railway, connecting Vienna to Trieste, next to it. Sežana thus became connected to major traffic and soon emerged as the most important center on the Karst Plateau, together with Opicina. After 1918, it was annexed to the Kingdom of Italy and included in the Province of Trieste. During the Fascist period, the population was subjected to a violent Italianization policy, and many locals joined the militant anti-fascist organization TIGR. During World War II, especially after 1943, the area became a battlefield between the Partisan resistance and the Fascist and Nazi German forces. In May 1945, Sežana was liberated by the Yugoslav Partisans. Between June 1945 and September 1947, it was administered by the British and U.S. Army. In 1947, it became part of the Socialist Federal Republic of Yugoslavia and, in 1991, of independent Slovenia.

Sežana railway station was opened in 1857, and forms part of the Vienna–Trieste railway.  Since 1947, it has been that railway's border crossing point between Yugoslavia/Slovenia and Italy.

Economy
Many industrial enterprises are located in Sežana, including larger companies as well as many smaller enterprises. Sežana is also a center for the tourism industry. Its location between Ljubljana, Trieste, and the Adriatic coast and many important tourist sights in the vicinity, such as the Lipica Stud Farm, Postojna Cave, Škocjan Caves, Vilenica Cave, and the fortified village of Štanjel, make Sežana an attractive tourist destination. Sežana is also an important agricultural center.

Sights

 Botanical Garden
 Memorial Room commemorating the poet Srečko Kosovel
 walking trail from Sežana to Tomaj dedicated to Kosovel
 Karst Living museum
 Tabor nature trail

Church

The parish church in the town is dedicated to Saint Martin and was built in 1878 on the site of an older church from the early 16th century, after it became an independent parish.

Gallery

Twin cities

 Montbrison, France
 Rab, Croatia
 Gevgelija, North Macedonia
 Sant'Ambrogio di Valpolicella, Italy
 Sant'Ambrogio sul Garigliano, Italy
 Pardubice, Czech Republic
 Gornji Milanovac, Serbia

References

External links

 
 Sežana at Geopedia
 Sežana, official page of municipality (in Slovenian)
 The town of Sezana, about the town of Sezana

 
Populated places in the Municipality of Sežana
Cities and towns in the Slovene Littoral